Carabus valikhanovi, is a species of ground beetle in the large genus Carabus.

References 

valikhanovi
Insects described in 1990